Mary Ann Hilliard (1860–1950) was an Irish nurse and suffragette. She was arrested for breaking windows in March 1912, and while imprisoned contributed to the Suffragette Handkerchief.

Biography 
Mary Ann Hilliard was born in Cork in 1860, to Dominick Hilliard, accountant and Margaret Duke and had two brothers and a sister. Known as Minnie, she trained as a nurse in England  from 1876 and was a senior staff member at the Alexandra Children's Hospital, Bloomsbury, London in 1908.

Hilliard was involved in the suffragette window-breaking by around 200 protestors in March 1912, and was arrested and sentenced to two months hard labour.

Hilliard and sixty-seven other Women's Social and Political Union (WSPU) suffragettes who were imprisoned in Holloway Prison embroidered their names on a cloth which became known as The Suffragette Handkerchief.   This was a brave act of defiance in a prison where the women were closely watched at all times, and it is thought that Hilliard started it, as she kept the souvenir of her fellow prisoners afterwards.

Signatories include Eileen Mary Casey, Alice Davies, Edith Downing, Katharine Gatty, Margaret Macfarlane, Helen MacRae, Alice Maud Shipley, Frances Williams and other leading women from WSPU mass window-smashing protests. Hilliard's own  embroidered name is in blue thread on the right of the title 'Votes for Women' (which she may have embroidered),  and 'Holloway Prison, March, 1912'.

Although Hilliard may have intended to donate it to the British College of Nurses, according to the British Journal of Nursing in March 1942, she was said to have kept it until she died in 1950.

The location of the item after Hilliard's death is unknown; it resurfaced in the 1960s at a jumble sale.

Later life 
Hilliard was a war nurse in World War One with Queen Alexandra's Imperial Military Nursing Service and served at the front in Italy, nursing prisoners. Her health deteriorated in the 1920s and she retired from nursing to live in Wembley, London.

She died in 1950. Her funeral was at Park Lane Methodist Church and cremation at Golders Green.

References 

British nurses
Irish suffragettes
1860 births
1950 deaths
People from Cork (city)